Moneyball is a 2011 American sports dramedy film directed by Bennett Miller with a script by Steven Zaillian and Aaron Sorkin from a story by Stan Chervin. The film is based on the 2003 nonfiction book by Michael Lewis, an account of the Oakland Athletics baseball team's 2002 season and their general manager Billy Beane's attempts to assemble a competitive team. In the film, Beane (Brad Pitt) and assistant general manager Peter Brand (Jonah Hill), faced with the franchise's limited budget for players, build a team of undervalued talent by taking a sophisticated sabermetric approach to scouting and analyzing players. Philip Seymour Hoffman also stars as Art Howe.

Columbia Pictures bought the rights to Lewis's book in 2004, hiring Chervin to write the screenplay. David Frankel was initially set to direct with Zaillian now writing the screenplay, but was soon replaced by Steven Soderbergh, who planned to make the film in a semi-documentary style featuring interviews from real athletes, and having the real players and coaches on the team portray themselves. But before its July 2009 filming start, the film was put in turnaround due to creative differences between Soderbergh and Sony over a last-minute script rewrite. Soderbergh exited, and Miller was hired to direct, with Pitt becoming a producer and Sorkin hired for rewrites. Filming began in July 2010 at various stadiums such as Dodger Stadium and Oakland Coliseum.

Moneyball premiered at the 2011 Toronto International Film Festival and was released on September 23, 2011, to box office success and critical acclaim, particularly for its acting and screenplay. The film was nominated for six Academy Awards, including Best Picture, Best Adapted Screenplay, Best Actor for Pitt and Best Supporting Actor for Hill.

Plot

Billy Beane, the general manager of the Oakland Athletics, is devastated by the team's loss to the New York Yankees in the 2001 American League Division Series. With the impending departure of the star players Johnny Damon, Jason Giambi and Jason Isringhausen to free agency, Beane needs to assemble a competitive team for 2002 with Oakland's limited budget.
 
During a scouting visit to the Cleveland Indians, Beane meets Peter Brand, a young Yale economics graduate with radical ideas about evaluating players. Beane asks whether Brand would have drafted him out of high school; though scouts considered Beane promising, his career in the major leagues was disappointing. Brand says he would not have drafted him until the ninth round. Impressed, Beane hires him.

Using Brand's sabermetric method, Beane signs undervalued players such as Chad Bradford, Jeremy Giambi and Scott Hatteberg, and also trades for David Justice. The Athletics' scouts are hostile toward the strategy, and Beane fires the head scout, Grady Fuson, after a heated confrontation. Beane also faces opposition from Art Howe, the Athletics' manager. Howe disregards Beane's and Brand's strategy and uses a more traditional lineup.
 
Early in the season, the Athletics are already ten games behind first, leading critics to dismiss the new method as a failure. Brand argues their sample size is too small to conclude the method does not work, and Beane convinces the team owner, Stephen Schott, to stay the course. To get help on defense, Beane trades Giambi to the Phillies for John Mabry and the only traditional first baseman, Carlos Peña, to the Tigers, leaving Howe no choice but to use the team Beane and Brand have designed. Three weeks later, the Athletics are only four games behind first.
 
Before the trade deadline, Beane acquires the relief pitcher Ricardo Rincón from the Indians, and on August 13, the Athletics start a winning streak. Beane, superstitiously, refuses to watch games in progress, but when the Athletics tie the American League record of 19 consecutive wins, his daughter persuades him to attend the next game against the Kansas City Royals. Oakland is leading 11–0 when Beane arrives in the fourth inning, only to watch the Royals even the score. Thanks to a walk-off home run by Hatteberg, the Athletics achieve a then record-breaking 20th consecutive win. Beane tells Brand he will not be satisfied until they have changed baseball by winning the World Series.
 
The Athletics win the American League West but lose to the Minnesota Twins in the American League Division Series, with an unseen baseball analyst explaining that some other tangibles of a player, such as drive and clutch performance, cannot be measured. The owner of the Boston Red Sox, John W. Henry, realizes that sabermetrics is the future of baseball. He gives Beane an offer to become the Red Sox general manager for a $12.5 million salary, which would make him the highest-paid general manager in sports history. In Oakland, Beane discloses the offer to Brand and says their strategy failed. Brand shows a video of a heavyset batter, Jeremy Brown, who hits a home run but does not realize it; Billy understands what Brand's trying to say, and thanks him. In his car, an emotional Beane listens to a cover of "The Show" recorded by his daughter in which she tells him to "just enjoy the show".

In an epilogue, Beane turns down Henry's offer, but the Red Sox still end up winning the World Series two years later, using Beane and Brand's model.

Cast

Film director Spike Jonze has a small uncredited role as Alán, Sharon's spouse. Activision Blizzard CEO Bobby Kotick appears as Athletics co-owner Stephen Schott.

Production

Development and pre-production

In May 2004, Sony Pictures acquired the rights to the Michael Lewis book, and had hired Stan Chervin to write the screenplay. By October 2008, Brad Pitt was being courted to star in the film, now being written by Steven Zaillian, and David Frankel was attached to direct. Frankel and Pitt met with one another during the week of the 66th Golden Globe Awards to discuss the project, but eventually Frankel would exit by February 2009, with Steven Soderbergh entering negotiations to direct. Soderbergh confirmed his involvement in May that year, and in talking about the film, stated "I think we have a way in, making it visual and making it funny. I want it to be really funny and entertaining, and I want you to not realize how much information is being thrown at you because you're having fun. We've found a couple of ideas on how to bust the form a bit, in order for all that information to reach you in a way that's a little oblique". Demetri Martin was cast to play Paul DePodesta in the film, with former Athletics players Scott Hatteberg and David Justice playing themselves, and interview segments featuring players Darryl Strawberry and Lenny Dykstra set to occur.

Production under Soderbergh was set to begin in July 2009, and was to be shot on location at Oakland Coliseum. Art Howe, former manager of the team, was also set to appear as himself. Five days before its July 8 filming start date, Sony cancelled the film and entered it into "limited turnaround". The cited reason for the cancellation was that, upon a last-minute script revision by Soderbergh that added "an abundance of baseball details", studio executives felt the audience would feel alienated. It was also stated that the studio now felt the film was too "arty" for its $58 million budget. Soderbergh was said to be unwilling to compromise, leaving Sony chairwoman Amy Pascal "apoplectic". Paramount Pictures and Warner Bros. both turned down offers to pick up the project. Soderbergh revealed he exited the film in a September 2009 interview with The Orlando Sentinel, saying, "There have been a couple of times in my career where I’ve been unceremoniously removed from projects. I don’t waste a lot of energy on it. It doesn’t get you anywhere. As soon as it became clear that there was no iteration of that movie that I was going to get to direct, I immediately started looking around for something else to do".

In December 2009, Bennett Miller was hired to direct the film, with the casting of Jonah Hill, who was replacing Martin as DePodesta, announced in March 2010. Upon his request as he felt the script no longer accurately depicted him, DePodesta's name was removed, with Hill now playing the role of Peter Brand. Aaron Sorkin was brought on to provide a rewrite of the screenplay. Pascal had specifically sought out Sorkin's involvement, in addition to Pitt joining as a producer, and bringing producer Scott Rudin on board as executive producer. Sorkin agreed on the condition Zaillian gave his blessing. Sorkin and Zaillian eventually worked on different drafts of the script independently of one another. Miller took three weeks to agree to do the film, and stated he wasn't interested in making a traditional sports film, seeking instead to make it "subversive to the genre. It's not really a conventional sports movie. It puts all that stuff on its head". Cinematographer Adam Kimmel was initially set to work on the film, but due to his April 2010 arrest for sexual assault, was replaced by Wally Pfister. In May, Philip Seymour Hoffman and Robin Wright entered negotiations to join the cast, with Hoffman portraying Howe, and Wright as Beane's ex-wife. Chris Pratt, Stephen Bishop and Kathryn Morris were added to the cast in July, though Morris's scenes were cut. Pratt described how he initially was told in his first audition for the role of Hatteberg that he was "too fat". He took three months to work out and shed 30 pounds, which led to him winning the role. Bishop, portraying Justice in the film, had grown up idolizing the player, and played baseball for the advanced A affiliate team of the Atlanta Braves at the time Justice was on their roster.

Filming
Filming was given a July 2010 start date with a reduced budget of $47 million after Pitt agreed to a pay cut. Filming took place at Blair Field for eight days. Dodger Stadium was used to stand in for multiple different stadiums due to the limited budget. Roughly 700 extras were used for fans in the stadiums for the various baseball scenes. Scenes were shot at the Oakland Coliseum beginning on July 26.

Music
The score was composed by Mychael Danna, with whom Miller worked on Capote. Danna implemented the song "The Mighty Rio Grande" by This Will Destroy You throughout the film. Joe Satriani plays the 'Star Spangled Banner' at the first game of the 2002 season.

Accuracy
In regard to the film's accuracy, David Haglund of Slate and Jonah Keri of Grantland criticized the film and book for excluding pitchers Tim Hudson, Mark Mulder, and Barry Zito and position players such as Eric Chavez and Miguel Tejada. These players were discovered via traditional scouting methods, and were key contributors  to the success of the 2002 Athletics.

Former Oakland A's manager Art Howe has spoken publicly about his disapproval of his portrayal in an interview on Sirius XM. “It is very disappointing to know that you spent seven years in an organization and gave your heart and soul to it and helped them go to the postseason your last three years there and win over 100 games your last two seasons and this is the way evidently your boss [Beane] feels about you.” Howe also said producers of Miller's version of the film didn't contact him to consult on his portrayal. Hatteberg also said that Howe was portrayed inaccurately, saying: "Art Howe was a huge supporter of mine. I never got the impression from him that I was not his first choice." He mentioned Howe and Beane had a "turbulent relationship".

The San Francisco Chronicle made note of several inaccuracies in the film, notably that players such as Giambi and Bradford had already joined the team before the time period in the film, and that the Giambi and Peña trades did not occur at the same time.

Release
Moneyball premiered at the Toronto International Film Festival on September 9, 2011, and was released theatrically on September 23, 2011, by Columbia Pictures. The film was also released on DVD and Blu-ray on December 6, 2011, by Sony Pictures Home Entertainment.

Box office
Moneyball grossed $75.6 million in the United States and Canada and $34.6 million in other territories for a worldwide total of $110.2 million, against a production budget of $50 million.

The film grossed $19.5 million from 2,993 theaters in its opening weekend, finishing second at the box office behind the 3D re-release of The Lion King. In its second weekend it grossed $12 million (a drop of only 38.3%), again finishing second.

Critical response
On Rotten Tomatoes, Moneyball holds an approval rating of 94% based on 265 reviews, with an average rating of 8.00/10. The website's critical consensus reads: "Director Bennett Miller, along with Brad Pitt and Jonah Hill, take a niche subject and turn it into a sharp, funny, and touching portrait worthy of baseball lore." On Metacritic, the film has a weighted average score of 87 out of 100, based on 42 critics, indicating "universal acclaim". Audiences polled by CinemaScore gave the film an average grade of "A" on an A+ to F scale. The film appeared on 35 critics' top-ten lists for the best films of 2011, with two critics ranking it first and another ranking it second.

Roger Ebert, in his four star review, praised the film for its "intelligence and depth", specifically highlighting the screenplay and its "terse, brainy dialogue". Manohla Dargis of The New York Times found Pitt's performance "relaxed yet edgy and sometimes unsettling", and stated she couldn't see anyone but Pitt in the role. Writing for Rolling Stone, Peter Travers also praised Pitt's performance, in addition to Miller's direction and the screenplay, which he referred to as "dynamite". Owen Gleiberman for Entertainment Weekly highlighted Hoffman's performance alongside Pitt and Hill, finding Hoffman "does a character turn that’s as fresh for him as the crew cut that makes him look like a grizzled old-timer". Kirk Honeycutt was complimentary of the comedic chemistry between Pitt and Hill, which prompted Honeycutt to compare the film to The Bad News Bears and Major League. In his review for New York magazine, while reviewing the film and Pitt's performance, David Edelstein found Pitt's performance made the film more focused towards Beane as opposed to the team. Dana Stevens of Slate found the film could be enjoyed by viewers who typically don't like sports movies. Stevens also highlighted Hill's performance, finding the role "gives him the chance to be funny, not by wisecracking broadly but by underreacting".

In a mixed review written for Slant Magazine, Bill Weber praised Pitt's performance, but found the film formulaic, stating "But true to Hollywood’s tireless efforts to fit square-peg material into roundish genre niches, this wavering, intermittently smart story of daring to think differently flattens its narrative into formula". Weber also felt the audience would endure "tonal whiplash", pointing to the scene of Beane and Brand executing various trades he felt was "played for Laughs", but found "the rhythm isn’t snappy enough to draw laughs". Peter Hartlaub of the San Francisco Chronicle found the film to be filled with compromises, writing "Someone crammed Major League-style sports cliches into a more nuanced story about baseball and progress - and then tried to fit a Brad Pitt star vehicle inside of that. The result is an interesting but frustrating near-miss". Hartlaub also criticized the film's runtime.

Accolades

Moneyball received six Academy Award nominations, including Best Picture, Best Actor (Pitt), Best Supporting Actor (Hill), Best Adapted Screenplay, Best Sound Mixing and Best Film Editing. At the 69th Golden Globe Awards, the film received four nominations for Best Motion Picture – Drama, Best Actor – Motion Picture Drama (Pitt), Best Supporting Actor – Motion Picture (Hill) and Best Screenplay.

References

External links

 
 
 
 
 
 

2011 films
2011 biographical drama films
2011 drama films
2010s sports drama films
American baseball films
American biographical films
American business films
Baseball statistics
Columbia Pictures films
Films based on biographies
Films based on non-fiction books
Films directed by Bennett Miller
Films produced by Brad Pitt
Films produced by Michael De Luca
Films scored by Mychael Danna
Films set in 2002
Films set in Boston
Films set in the San Francisco Bay Area
Films set in Cleveland
Films shot in Oakland, California
Oakland Athletics
Films with screenplays by Aaron Sorkin
Films with screenplays by Steven Zaillian
Sports films based on actual events
American sports drama films
Films based on works by Michael Lewis
2010s English-language films
2010s American films
Films about Major League Baseball